Sir Zahir-ud-Daula Bahadur GCSI (died 16 June 1879) was the titular Nawab of Arcot from 1874 to 1879.

Early life 

Zahir-ud-Daula was the son of Azim Jah, the first Nawab of Arcot and cousin to Ghulam Muhammad Ghouse Khan, the twelfth and last Nawab of the Carnatic.

Reign 

Zahir-ud-Daula was recognized as the titular Nawab of Arcot or Amir-i-Arcot on the death of his father Azim Jah in 1874. In 1876, he moved the official residence to the Amir Mahal. He also participated in the Delhi Durbar of January 1877, during which the proclamation of Queen Victoria as the Empress of India was made. Zahir-ud-Daula was awarded the GCSI and the honour of a 15-gun salute.

Death 

Zahir-ud-Daula died in 1879 and was buried with state honours.

References 

 

Indian Muslims
1879 deaths
Nawabs of India
Knights Grand Commander of the Order of the Star of India
Year of birth missing